Dough is a 2015 British-Hungarian movie.

Plot
Nat Dayan, the owner of a Jewish bakery, hires Muslim African immigrant Ayyash Habimana to work in the shop.  Ayyash drops marijuana into the dough to hide it, but then the marijuana gets mixed in — and then things really start cooking...

Cast
 Jonathan Pryce as Nat Dayan – Baker
 Jerome Holder as Ayyash Habimama – Apprentice
 Philip Davis as Sam Cotton – Competitor
 Ian Hart as Victor Gerrard – Drug dealer
 Pauline Collins as Joanna Silverman – Lady friend
 Andrew Ellis as Lucas – Friend
 Malachi Kirby as Shaun – Friend
 Natasha Gordon as Safa Habimama – Mother
 Melanie Freeman as Olivia Dayan – Granddaughter

External links
 

2015 films
British films about cannabis
Films scored by Lorne Balfe
Films set in London
Films about food and drink
2010s English-language films
British comedy-drama films
2010s British films
Films about Jews and Judaism
Films about Islam